Nishatpura railway station (station code: NSZ) is a terminal railway station of Bhopal City, the capital of Madhya Pradesh. It also has a good train yard, siding, and fueling depot for diesel engines. It is operated by West Central Railway. It is famous for the coach repair workshop of the Indian railways.

Development
The railways decided to redevelop Nishatpura into a fully-functional railway station, to decrease the load on the Bhopal Junction railway station as the trains coming from Bina and going towards Indore have to undergo loco-reversal at Bhopal Junction. The development of Nishatpura would save the time and logistics both.

References

Railway stations in Bhopal
Bhopal railway division
Year of establishment missing